Route 117 is a short highway in Dent County.  Its northern terminus is at Route 19 northeast of Salem; its southern terminus is in Indian Trail Conservation Area.

Route description
Route 117 begins in the Indian Trail Conservation Area at an intersection with two park roads. The route heads northwest through areas of dense forest on a two-lane undivided road. Route 117 comes to its northern terminus at an intersection with Route 19 northeast of Salem. It is one of the only 2 highways in Missouri to be less than 1 mile. the other being Missouri Route 799 at 0.50 miles.

Major intersections

References

117
Transportation in Dent County, Missouri